Martha's Vineyard LORAN-C transmitter was a LORAN-C transmitter at Aquinnah, Massachusetts. It was closed in 1962 and operations were transferred to LORAN-C transmitter Nantucket at that time.

See also 
 List of masts
 List of military installations in Massachusetts

External links 
 Loran Station Martha's Vineyard
 Excel-File with information about LORAN-C transmitters

LORAN-C transmitters in the United States
Military facilities in Massachusetts
Buildings and structures in Dukes County, Massachusetts
1957 establishments in Massachusetts
1962 disestablishments in Massachusetts
Military installations established in 1957
Military installations closed in 1962